Haley Nicole Nemra (born October 4, 1989) is an American-born Marshallese track athlete from Marysville, Washington. She was the first woman to represent the Marshall Islands at the Olympics.

She represented her country at the 2008 Summer Olympics and the 2012 Summer Olympics in the women's 800 meters where she did not advance to the semifinals but finished with a personal best time of 2:14.90.  She was flag-bearer for Marshall Islands during the Opening Ceremony in London.  She competed for the University of San Francisco from 2008–2011.

Achievements

References

External links
 
Sports reference biography

1989 births
Living people
People from Marysville, Washington
American people of Marshallese descent
Marshallese female middle-distance runners
American female middle-distance runners
American female long-distance runners
Athletes (track and field) at the 2008 Summer Olympics
Athletes (track and field) at the 2012 Summer Olympics
Olympic track and field athletes of the Marshall Islands
San Francisco Dons women's track and field athletes
Sportspeople from Washington (state)